The DEFinition is the tenth studio album by American rapper LL Cool J, released on August 31, 2004 by Def Jam Recordings. Largely produced by Timbaland, with several tracks produced by N.O. Joe, Teddy Riley, and 7 Aurelius, the album peaked at number 4 on the US Billboard 200 and spawned two singles: "Headsprung" and "Hush". It was certified Gold by the RIAA for selling over 500,000 copies.

Critical reception

The DEFinition received a mild reception from music critics, saying that it was better than 2002's 10 because of Timbaland's production. At Metacritic, which assigns a normalized rating out of 100 to reviews from mainstream critics, the album received an average score of 66, based on 9 reviews.

Steve 'Flash' Juon of RapReviews called The DEFinition LL's "TRUE tenth album," praising its change in sound from New York to Southern by Timbaland, balancing out the bangers and slow songs well and LL for still keeping his lyrical content up to date, concluding that "this new album proves he doesn't have to give up acting to keep rapping." AllMusic's David Jeffries said that the album had more energy than 10 because of Timbaland's take on the southern sound and finding a balance between braggadocious rap and lovers rap. Gavin Edwards of Rolling Stone also praised the production for updating LL's sound along with his lyrics, saying that "on the eleventh record of his amazingly consistent twenty-year career, LL Cool J has as much swaggering presence as ever." Nick Southall of Stylus Magazine was mixed about the album, saying that he enjoyed the love jams better than the Timbaland bangers which were merely passable, concluding that "there's a distinct lack of personality, meaning that LL Cool J's eleventh long player is merely good, and his reputation (and bank balance) will be neither tarnished nor expanded."

Chart performance
The DEFinition debuted and peaked at number four on the US Bilboard 200 in the week of September 18, 2004,  selling 173,000 copies in its first week of release. This marked LL Cool J's biggest first week sales yet, surpassing the opening sales of  previous album 10, which bowed with 154,000 copies. The DEFinition was certified gold by the Recording Industry Association of America (RIAA) on October 5, 2004. By February 2006, it had sold 747,000 copies in the United States, according to Nielsen SoundScan.

Track listing
Credits adapted from the album's liner notes.

Notes
 signifies a co-producer

Charts

Weekly charts

Year-end charts

Certifications

References

2004 albums
LL Cool J albums
Def Jam Recordings albums
Albums produced by Timbaland
Albums produced by Teddy Riley
Albums produced by Dame Grease
Albums produced by N.O. Joe